The Institute of Science and Technology, Bangladesh, or IST, is a private institute located at Dhaka, Bangladesh and first affiliated institute with the National University. The institute is regulated by a governing body consisting of professors of Dhaka University, subjects experts, within the rules and regulations of National University of Bangladesh.

History
IST was established in 1993, the first institute in Bangladesh conducting Honors in computer science affiliated with National University. It was inaugurated in the presence of Nobel Laureate Abdus Salam and by the former Prime Minister Begum Khaleda Zia. It is completely non-profit, non-government and non-political.

Programs and courses
IST imparts education in various undergraduate, postgraduate and management courses.

Research
The research group includes:

Artificial Intelligence & Neural Networks, Computer Graphics & Image Processing, Computer Networks, Cryptography & Network Security, Database Systems & Software Engineering, Electronics & Communications, Mathematics & Statistics, Accounting, Finance, Management and Marketing.

References

External links
 

1993 establishments in Bangladesh
Educational institutions established in 1993
Universities and colleges in Dhaka
Private universities in Bangladesh